Arpa Chai or Arpa Chay or Arpachay or Arpachayi may refer to:
 Arpa Chai, Ardabil
 Arpachayi, West Azerbaijan
 Arpa-Chay, or Arpachay, or Akhurian River

See also
 Arpaçay (disambiguation)